This page summarises the Australia national soccer team fixtures and results in 2010.

Summary
The year started with Australia's final two qualification matches for the 2011 AFC Asian Cup. Qualification was sealed by topping the group. Australia won four of eight friendlies during the year however the main event was the 2010 World Cup. With a win, draw and a loss, Australia failed to progress from the group stage on goal difference.

Record

Match results

Friendlies

World Cup

Asian Cup qualification

Goal scorers

References

 Australia: Fixtures and Results

2010
2010 in Australian soccer
2010 national football team results